"(Freak) And U Know It" is the first single released off Adina Howard's studio album, Welcome to Fantasy Island. The song is produced by DJ Quik, Robert "Fonksta" Bacon, and G-One. The song debuted on Billboard Hot 100 at 70 and the Hot R&B/Hip-Hop Songs at 30.

Critical reception 
Larry Flick from Billboard wrote, "Howard aims to prove that there's no sophomore slump in her future with this sassy, disco-kissed R&B throw-down. Yeah, she's workin' the "freak" thang yet again. And, yeah, she's capable of far better. But the truth is that the hook here is just too darn infectious to allow for much complaining. Kids are going to love the Cameo-styled keyboard effects that underline the chorus. A fine way to preview the album "Welcome To Fantasy Island"."

Track listing 
CD single
"(Freak) And U Know It (Radio Edit)" - 4:02
"(Freak) And U Know It (Vybe Remix - Extended)" - 4:35
"(Freak) And U Know It (Vybe Remix - Instrumental)" - 4:18
"(Freak) And U Know It (Gods Of Prophet Slimmi Trip Remix)" - 6:17
"(Freak) And U Know It (Club Mix)" - 7:17
"(Freak) And U Know It (Instrumental)" - 4:10
"(Freak) And U Know It (Acappella)" - 4:08

Personnel 
Credits for (Freak) And U Know It adapted from Allmusic.

 Chris Puram, DJ Quik - Mixed
 DJ Quik, G-One, Rob Bacon - Producer
 Chris Puram - Recording
 Taresha Hudson - Writing

Chart performance

References 

1997 singles
Adina Howard songs
Song recordings produced by DJ Quik
1997 songs
East West Records singles
Music videos directed by Francis Lawrence
Songs written by DJ Quik